Georges-Louis Leclerc, Comte de Buffon (7 September 1707 – 16 April 1788) was a French naturalist, mathematician, and cosmologist. He held the position of intendant (director) at the Jardin du Roi, now called the Jardin des Plantes.

Buffon's works influenced the next two generations of naturalists, including two prominent French scientists Jean-Baptiste Lamarck and Georges Cuvier. Buffon published thirty-six quarto volumes of his Histoire Naturelle during his lifetime, with additional volumes based on his notes and further research being published in the two decades following his death.

Ernst Mayr wrote that "Truly, Buffon was the father of all thought in natural history in the second half of the 18th century". Credited with being one of the first naturalists to recognize ecological succession, he was later forced by the theology committee at the University of Paris to recant his theories about geological history and animal evolution because they contradicted the Biblical narrative of Creation.

Early life
Georges Louis Leclerc (later Comte de Buffon) was born at Montbard, in the Province of Burgundy to Benjamin François Leclerc, a minor local official in charge of the salt tax and Anne-Christine Marlin also from a family of civil servants. Georges was named after his mother's uncle (his godfather) Georges Blaisot, the tax-farmer of the Duke of Savoy for all of Sicily. In 1714 Blaisot died childless, leaving a considerable fortune to his seven-year-old godson. Benjamin Leclerc then purchased an estate containing the nearby village of Buffon and moved the family to Dijon acquiring various offices there as well as a seat in the Dijon Parlement.

Georges attended the Jesuit College of Godrans in Dijon from the age of ten onwards. From 1723 to 1726 he then studied law in Dijon, the prerequisite for continuing the family tradition in civil service. In 1728 Georges left Dijon to study mathematics and medicine at the University of Angers in France. At Angers in 1730 he made the acquaintance of the young English Duke of Kingston, who was on his grand tour of Europe, and traveled with him on a large and expensive entourage for a year and a half through southern France and parts of Italy.

There are persistent but completely undocumented rumors from this period about duels, abductions and secret trips to England. In 1732 after the death of his mother and before the impending remarriage of his father, Georges left Kingston and returned to Dijon to secure his inheritance. Having added 'de Buffon' to his name while traveling with the Duke, he repurchased the village of Buffon, which his father had meanwhile sold off. With a fortune of about 80,000 livres Buffon set himself up in Paris to pursue science, at first primarily mathematics and mechanics, and the increase of his fortune.

Career

In 1732 he moved to Paris, where he made the acquaintance of Voltaire and other intellectuals. He lived in the Faubourg Saint-Germain, with Gilles-François Boulduc, first apothecary of the King, professor of chemistry at the Royal Garden of Plants, member of the Academy of Sciences. He first made his mark in the field of mathematics and, in his  (On the game of fair-square), introduced differential and integral calculus into probability theory; the problem of Buffon's needle in probability theory is named after him. In 1734 he was admitted to the French Academy of Sciences. During this period he corresponded with the Swiss mathematician Gabriel Cramer.

His protector Maurepas had asked the Academy of Sciences to do research on wood for the construction of ships in 1733. Soon afterward, Buffon began a long-term study, performing some of the most comprehensive tests to date on the mechanical properties of wood. Included were a series of tests to compare the properties of small specimens with those of large members. After carefully testing more than a thousand small specimens without knots or other defects, Buffon concluded that it was not possible to extrapolate to the properties of full-size timbers, and he began a series of tests on full-size structural members.

In 1739 he was appointed head of the Parisian Jardin du Roi with the help of Maurepas; he held this position to the end of his life. Buffon was instrumental in transforming the Jardin du Roi into a major research center and museum. He also enlarged it, arranging the purchase of adjoining plots of land and acquiring new botanical and zoological specimens from all over the world.

Thanks to his talent as a writer, he was invited to join Paris's second great academy, the Académie Française in 1753 and then in 1768 he was elected to the American Philosophical Society. In his  ("Discourse on Style"), pronounced before the Académie française, he said, "Writing well consists of thinking, feeling and expressing well, of clarity of mind, soul and taste ... The style is the man himself" (""). Unfortunately for him, Buffon's reputation as a literary stylist also gave ammunition to his detractors: The mathematician Jean le Rond D'Alembert, for example, called him "the great phrase-monger".

In 1752 Buffon married Marie-Françoise de Saint-Belin-Malain, the daughter of an impoverished noble family from Burgundy, who had been enrolled in the convent school run by his sister. Madame de Buffon's second child, a son born in 1764, survived childhood; she herself died in 1769. When in 1772 Buffon became seriously ill and the promise that his son (then only 8) should succeed him as director of the Jardin became clearly impracticable and was withdrawn, the King raised Buffon's estates in Burgundy to the status of a county – and thus Buffon (and his son) became a count. He was elected a Foreign Honorary Member of the American Academy of Arts and Sciences in 1782. Buffon died in Paris in 1788.

He was buried in a chapel adjacent to the church of Sainte-Urse Montbard; during the French Revolution, his tomb was broken into and the lead that covered the coffin was ransacked to produce bullets. His heart was initially saved, as it was guarded by Suzanne Necker (wife of Jacques Necker), but was later lost. Today, only Buffon's cerebellum remains, as it is kept in the base of the statue by Pajou that Louis XVI had commissioned in his honor in 1776, located at the Museum of Natural History in Paris.

Works 

Buffon's Histoire naturelle, générale et particulière (1749–1788: in 36 volumes; an additional volume based on his notes appeared in 1789) was originally intended to cover all three "kingdoms" of nature but the Histoire naturelle ended up being limited to the animal and mineral kingdoms, and the animals covered were only the birds and quadrupeds. "Written in a brilliant style, this work was read ... by every educated person in Europe". Those who assisted him in the production of this great work included Louis-Jean-Marie Daubenton, Philibert Guéneau de Montbeillard, and Gabriel-Léopold Bexon, along with numerous artists. Buffon's  was translated into many different languages, making him one of the most widely read authors of the day, a rival to Montesquieu, Rousseau, and Voltaire.

In the opening volumes of the Histoire naturelle Buffon questioned the usefulness of mathematics, criticized Carl Linnaeus's taxonomical approach to natural history, outlined a history of the Earth with little relation to the Biblical account, and proposed a theory of reproduction that ran counter to the prevailing theory of pre-existence. The early volumes were condemned by the Faculty of Theology at the Sorbonne. Buffon published a retraction, but he continued publishing the offending volumes without any change.

In the course of his examination of the animal world, Buffon noted that despite similar environments, different regions have distinct plants and animals, a concept later known as Buffon's Law. This is considered to be the first principle of biogeography. He made the suggestion that species may have both "improved" and "degenerated" after dispersing from a center of creation. In volume 14 he argued that all the world's quadrupeds had developed from an original set of just thirty-eight quadrupeds. On this basis, he is sometimes considered a "transformist" and a precursor of Darwin. He also asserted that climate change may have facilitated the worldwide spread of species from their centers of origin. Still, interpreting his ideas on the subject is not simple, for he returned to topics many times in the course of his work.

Buffon considered the similarities between humans and apes, but ultimately rejected the possibility of a common descent. He debated with James Burnett, Lord Monboddo on the relationship of the primates to man, Monboddo insisting, against Buffon, on a close relationship.

At one point, Buffon propounded a theory that nature in the New World was inferior to that of Eurasia. He argued that the Americas were lacking in large and powerful creatures, and that even the people were less virile than their European counterparts. He ascribed this inferiority to the marsh odors and dense forests of the American continent. These remarks so incensed Thomas Jefferson that he dispatched twenty soldiers to the New Hampshire woods to find a bull moose for Buffon as proof of the "stature and majesty of American quadrupeds".

In Les époques de la nature (1778) Buffon discussed the origins of the Solar System, speculating that the planets had been created by a comet's collision with the Sun. He also suggested that the Earth originated much earlier than 4004 BC, the date determined by Archbishop James Ussher. Basing his figures on the cooling rate of iron tested at his Laboratory the Petit Fontenet at Montbard, he calculated that the age of the Earth was 75,000 years. Once again, his ideas were condemned by the Sorbonne, and once again he issued a retraction to avoid further problems.

Publications

Racial studies

Buffon and Johann Blumenbach were believers in monogenism, the concept that all races have a single origin. They also believed in the "degeneration theory" of racial origins. They both said that Adam and Eve were Caucasian and that other races came about by degeneration from environmental factors, such as the sun and poor diet. They believed that the degeneration could be reversed if proper environmental control was taken, and that all contemporary forms of man could revert to the original Caucasian race.

Buffon and Blumenbach claimed that pigmentation arose because of the heat of the tropical sun. They suggested cold wind caused the tawny colour of the Eskimos. They thought the Chinese relatively fair-skinned compared to the other Asian stocks because they kept mostly in towns and were protected from environmental factors. Buffon said that food and the mode of living could make races degenerate and distinguish them from the original Caucasian race.

Believing in monogenism, Buffon thought that skin color could change in a single lifetime, depending on the conditions of climate and diet.

Buffon was an advocate of the Asia hypothesis; in his Histoire Naturelle, he argued that humans' birthplace must be in a high temperate zone. As he believed good climate conditions would breed healthy humans, he hypothesized that the most logical place to look for the first humans' existence would be in Asia and around the Caspian Sea region.

Relevance to modern biology
Charles Darwin wrote in his preliminary historical sketch added to the third edition of On the Origin of Species: "Passing over ... Buffon, with whose writings I am not familiar". Then, from the fourth edition onwards, he amended this to say that "the first author who in modern times has treated it [evolution] in a scientific spirit was Buffon. But as his opinions fluctuated greatly at different periods, and as he does not enter on the causes or means of the transformation of species, I need not here enter on details". Buffon's work on degeneration, however, was immensely influential on later scholars but was overshadowed by strong moral overtones.

The paradox of Buffon is that, according to Ernst Mayr:

Buffon wrote about the concept of struggle for existence. He developed a system of heredity which was similar to Darwin's hypothesis of pangenesis. Commenting on Buffon's views, Darwin stated, "If Buffon had assumed that his organic molecules had been formed by each separate unit throughout the body, his view and mine would have been very closely similar."

Works
Buffon, Œuvres, ed. S. Schmitt and C. Crémière, Paris: Gallimard, 2007.

Complete works
 Vol 1. Histoire naturelle, générale et particulière, avec la description du Cabinet du Roy. Tome I (1749). Texte établi, introduit et annoté par Stéphane Schmitt avec la collaboration de Cédric Crémière, Paris: Honoré Champion, 2007, 1376 p.
 Vol 2. Histoire naturelle, générale et particulière avec la participation du Cabinet du Roy. Tome II. Texte établi, introduit et annoté par Stéphane Schmitt, avec la collaboration de Cédric Crémière, Paris: Honoré Champion, 2008, 808 p.
 Vol 3. Histoire naturelle, générale et particulière, avec la description du Cabinet du Roy. Texte établi, introduit et annoté par Stéphane Schmitt avec la collaboration de Cédric Crémière. Tome III (1749), Paris: Honoré Champion, 2009, 776 p.
 Vol 4. Histoire naturelle, générale et particulière, avec la description du Cabinet du Roi. Texte établi, introduit et annoté par Stéphane Schmitt avec la collaboration de Cédric Crémière. Tome IV (1753), Paris: Honoré Champion, 2010. 1 vol., 864 p.
 Vol 5. Histoire naturelle, générale et particulière, avec la description du Cabinet du Roi. Texte établi, introduit et annoté par Stéphane Schmitt avec la collaboration de Cédric Crémière. Tome V (1755), Paris: Honoré Champion, 2010. 1 vol., 536 p.
 Vol 6. Histoire naturelle, générale et particulière, avec la description du Cabinet du Roi. Texte établi, introduit et annoté par Stéphane Schmitt avec la collaboration de Cédric Crémière. Tome VI (1756), Paris: Honoré Champion, 2011. 1 vol., 504 p.
 Vol. 7. Histoire naturelle, générale et particulière, avec la description du Cabinet du Roi. Texte établi, introduit et annoté par Stéphane Schmitt avec la collaboration de Cédric Crémière. Tome VII (1758), Paris: Honoré Champion, 2011. 1 vol., 544 p.
 Vol. 8. Histoire naturelle, générale et particulière, avec la description du Cabinet du Roi. Texte établi, introduit et annoté par Stéphane Schmitt avec la collaboration de Cédric Crémière. Tome VIII (1760), Paris: Honoré Champion, 2014, 640 p.
 Vol. 9. Histoire naturelle, générale et particulière, avec la description du Cabinet du Roi. Texte établi, introduit et annoté par Stéphane Schmitt avec la collaboration de Cédric Crémière. Tome IX (1761), Paris: Honoré Champion, 2016, 720 p.
 Vol. 10. Histoire naturelle, générale et particulière, avec la description du Cabinet du Roi. Texte établi, introduit et annoté par Stéphane Schmitt avec la collaboration de Cédric Crémière. Tome X (1763), Paris: Honoré Champion, 2017, 814 p.
 Vol. 11. Histoire naturelle, générale et particulière, avec la description du Cabinet du Roi. Texte établi, introduit et annoté par Stéphane Schmitt avec la collaboration de Cédric Crémière. Tome XI (1764), Paris: Honoré Champion, 2018, 724 p.
 Vol. 12. Histoire naturelle, générale et particulière, avec la description du Cabinet du Roi. Texte établi, introduit et annoté par Stéphane Schmitt avec la collaboration de Cédric Crémière. Tome XII (1764), Paris: Honoré Champion, 2018, 810 p.
 Vol. 13. Histoire naturelle, générale et particulière, avec la description du Cabinet du Roi. Texte établi, introduit et annoté par Stéphane Schmitt avec la collaboration de Cédric Crémière. Tome XIII (1765), Paris: Honoré Champion, 2019, 887 p. 
 Vol. 14. Histoire naturelle, générale et particulière, avec la description du Cabinet du Roi. Texte établi, introduit et annoté par Stéphane Schmitt avec la collaboration de Cédric Crémière. Tome XIV (1768), Paris: Honoré Champion, 2020, 605 p. 
 Vol. 15. Histoire naturelle, générale et particulière, avec la description du Cabinet du Roi. Texte établi, introduit et annoté par Stéphane Schmitt avec la collaboration de Cédric Crémière. Tome XV (1767), Paris: Honoré Champion, 2021, 764 p.

Eponyms of Buffon
 rue Buffon, Dijon

See also
 Scientific Revolution
 Suites à Buffon
 Buffon's Needle
 Rejection sampling

References

External links

 

 
 
 
  The Buffon project : 
 The same, in English: L'histoire naturelle
 Buffon's Hypothesis about the Origin of the Earth  
 Buffon's View of Domestic Cats
 Digital text Kyoto University
 
 Buffon's American Degeneracy, from The Academy of Natural Sciences
 William Smellie's English Translation of Buffon's Natural History, General and Particular, 3rd Edition
  Discours sur le Style – at athena.unige.ch
Gaedike, R.; Groll, E. K. & Taeger, A. 2012: Bibliography of the entomological literature from the beginning until 1863 : online database - version 1.0 - Senckenberg Deutsches Entomologisches Institut.
A collection of high-resolution scans of animal illustrations from several books by Buffon, from the Linda Hall Library
 Buffon's Histoire naturelle des époches de la nature, (this ed. published as Histoire naturelle, générale et particulière, avec la description du cabinet du roy, suppl. vol. 5. in 1778) - digital facsimile from the Linda Hall Library
 

1707 births
1788 deaths
People from Montbard
French naturalists
French ornithologists
18th-century French zoologists
French Roman Catholics
University of Angers (pre-1793) alumni
Proto-evolutionary biologists
Members of the Académie Française
Members of the French Academy of Sciences
Contributors to the Encyclopédie (1751–1772)
Counts of Buffon
French science writers
Fellows of the American Academy of Arts and Sciences
Fellows of the Royal Society
18th-century French male writers
18th-century French mathematicians
Founder Fellows of the Royal Society of Edinburgh
French male non-fiction writers
National Museum of Natural History (France) people